The gens Reginia was an obscure plebeian family at ancient Rome.  Few members of this gens are mentioned in history, but several are known from inscriptions.

Origin
The nomen Reginius belongs to a class of gentilicia formed from cognomina ending in -inus.  Reginus, the surname and probable root of this nomen, belongs to a type of cognomen derived from the names of places, in this case the ancient city of Rhegium in Bruttium, presumable the place where the ancestors of the Reginii lived.

Members

 Gaius Reginius, a soldier in the eighth cohort of the praetorian guard, who placed a monument at Rome in memory of his colleague, Gaius Julius Verus.
 Gaius Reginius December, built a monument for his wife, Cintusmina, the daughter of Magionus, at Durocortorum in Gallia Belgica.
 Marcus Reginius M. f. Eutyches, a native of Lycia, was a soldier in the twelfth urban cohort at Rome in AD 197, serving the century of Romanus.
 Reginia Grata, built a tomb at Cortona in Etruria for her husband, Aulus Gellius Etruscus.
 Reginius Justinus, a probably a military tribune, named in a libationary inscription dedicated to Neptune, found at Banna in Britain.
 Reginia Maxima, buried at Rome with her husband, Publius Vibius Marianus, a decorated soldier, formerly centurion primus pilus of the third legion, in a tomb dedicated by their daughters, Julia Dertona and Vibia Maria Maxima.
 Reginia Paterna, made an offering to Semele at Colonia Claudia Ara Agrippinensium in Germania Inferior.
 Quintus Reginius Silvanus, buried at Lactora in Gallia Aquitania, together with his wife, Julia Comenua.
 Reginia Titula, a native of Arabia Petraea, buried at Rome, aged twenty-nine, with a monument from her husband, Aurelius Septimius.

See also
 List of Roman gentes

References

Bibliography
 Theodor Mommsen et alii, Corpus Inscriptionum Latinarum (The Body of Latin Inscriptions, abbreviated CIL), Berlin-Brandenburgische Akademie der Wissenschaften (1853–present).
 René Cagnat et alii, L'Année épigraphique (The Year in Epigraphy, abbreviated AE), Presses Universitaires de France (1888–present).
 Paul von Rohden, Elimar Klebs, & Hermann Dessau, Prosopographia Imperii Romani (The Prosopography of the Roman Empire, abbreviated PIR), Berlin (1898).
 John C. Traupman, The New College Latin & English Dictionary, Bantam Books, New York (1995).

Roman gentes